The Greatest Hits is a compilation album by the Canadian Rock band Toronto, released in 1984. The album features two new studio tracks: "Andrea" and "Me Generation".  The CD release features the bonus track "What About Love", as well as music videos for three songs.

Track listing

Side 1
"Your Daddy Don't Know" - 5:06
"Lookin' for Trouble" - 3:15
"Enough Is Enough" - 4:24
"Start Tellin' the Truth" - 3:29
"Even the Score" - 4:10
"Andrea" - 3:19

Side 2
"Ready to Make Up" - 2:59
"All I Need" - 4:07
"Silver Screen" - 3:30
"Girls' Night Out" - 4:34
"Head On" - 3:56
"Me Generation" - 3:55

CD edition bonus tracks
"What About Love" - 3:58
"Your Daddy Don't Know" (video)
"Start Tellin' the Truth" (video)
"When Can I See You Again? (Toronto)" (video)

Musicians
Holly Woods - lead vocals
Sheron Alton - guitar, backing vocals
Brian Allen - guitar, lead vocals
Scott Kreyer - keyboards, backing vocals
Nick Costello - bass guitar
Gary LaLonde - bass guitar
Mike Gingrich - bass guitar
Jimmy Fox - drums
Barry Connors - drums

References

1984 greatest hits albums
Toronto (band) albums